François-Sévère Lesieur Désaulniers (September 19, 1850 – January 29, 1913) was a politician in the province of Quebec, Canada.  He served as Member of the Legislative Assembly.

Early life

He was born on September 19, 1850, in Yamachiche, Mauricie.  He was ordained in 1872, but left the priesthood three years later and became an attorney.

Provincial politics

Désaulniers was elected as a Conservative candidate to the Legislative Assembly of Quebec in 1878, representing the district of Saint-Maurice.  He was re-elected in 1881, but did not run for re-election in 1886.  He was succeeded by law practice partner Nérée Le Noblet Duplessis and moved to federal politics.

Federal politics

He was elected as a Conservative candidate to the House of Commons of Canada in 1887, representing the district of Saint-Maurice.  He was re-elected in 1891, but did not run for re-election in 1896.

Death

He died in Montreal on January 29, 1913.

References

1850 births
1913 deaths
Conservative Party of Canada (1867–1942) MPs
Members of the House of Commons of Canada from Quebec
Conservative Party of Quebec MNAs